Phyo Ko Ko Thein (born 24 January 1993) is a footballer from Burma, and a midfielder for the Myanmar national football team and Myanmar U23.

He currently plays for Ayeyawady United in Myanmar National League.

References

1993 births
Living people
Burmese footballers
Myanmar international footballers
Ayeyawady United F.C. players
Association football midfielders
Southeast Asian Games silver medalists for Myanmar
Southeast Asian Games medalists in football
Competitors at the 2015 Southeast Asian Games